Streetz Got Luv 4 Me' is the second album by rapper Mr. Marcelo. It was released July 31, 2001 through Tuff Guys Entertainment.

Track listing
 "Intro"
 "Can't Harm Me"
 "I'll Do U Somethin'" (featuring Mystikal & Curren$y)
 "Magnolia Breakin' Em Off" (featuring Soulja Slim)
 "One & One" (featuring Curren$y & Lil' Doc)
 "3rd Ward G's" (featuring Baby & Doe Doe)
 "When I Spit"
 "GTO" (featuring Lil' Doc & Curren$y)
 "Livin' It Up" (featuring C-Murder & Ke'Noe)
 "Whatcha' Want Brick?"
 "Redrum" (featuring Popeye)
 "Soldier Story"
 "Strictly Street"
 "Who Want It?" (featuring Curren$y)
 "Whatever"
 "Respect It" (featuring Ton-Toe & Lil' Doc)
 "Desperados" (featuring B-Black, Curren$y & Krazy)
 "Wicked Flow" (featuring Chyna Whyte & Badd Boyz)
 "The Ghetto" (featuring Lil' Doc)
 "Outro" (featuring Curren$y)

References
 https://www.amazon.com/Streetz-Got-Luv-4-Me/dp/B00005M0AV/ref=sr_1_3?ie=UTF8&s=music&qid=1252694507&sr=8-3

2001 albums
Mr. Marcelo albums